Felicia (minor planet designation: 294 Felicia) is a sizeable Main belt asteroid. It is approximately 35 km in diameter and has an orbital period of 5.5 years. It was discovered by Auguste Charlois on 15 July 1890 in Nice.

References

External links
 
 

Background asteroids
18900715
Felicia
Felicia